São Francisco Xavier / Tijuca Station is a subway station on the Rio de Janeiro Metro that services the neighbourhood of Tijuca in the North Zone of Rio de Janeiro. It is located next to a church of the same name and the Teatro Ziembinski.

References

Metrô Rio stations
Railway stations opened in 1982
1982 establishments in Brazil